In finance, arbitrage pricing theory (APT) is a multi-factor model for asset pricing which relates various macro-economic (systematic) risk variables to the pricing of financial assets. Proposed by economist Stephen Ross in 1976, it is widely believed to be an improved alternative to its predecessor, the Capital Asset Pricing Model (CAPM). APT is founded upon the law of one price, which suggests that within an equilibrium market, rational investors will implement arbitrage such that the equilibrium price is eventually realised. As such, APT argues that when opportunities for arbitrage are exhausted in a given period, then the expected return of an asset is a linear function of various factors or theoretical market indices, where sensitivities of each factor is represented by a factor-specific beta coefficient or factor loading. Consequently, it provides traders with an indication of ‘true’ asset value and enables exploitation of market discrepancies via arbitrage. The linear factor model structure of the APT is used as the basis for evaluating asset allocation, the performance of managed funds as well as the calculation of cost of capital.

Model

APT is a single-period static model, which helps investors understand the trade-off between risk and return. The average investor aims to optimise the returns for any given level or risk and as such, expects a positive return for bearing greater risk. As per the APT model, risky asset returns are said to follow a factor intensity structure if they can be expressed as:

where
 is a constant for asset 
 is a systematic factor
 is the sensitivity of the th asset to factor , also called factor loading,

Idiosyncratic shocks are assumed to be uncorrelated across assets and uncorrelated with the factors.

The APT model states that if asset returns follow a factor structure then the following relation exists between expected returns and the factor sensitivities:

where
  is the risk premium of the factor,
  is the risk-free rate,

That is, the expected return of an asset j is a linear function of the asset's sensitivities to the n factors.

Note that there are some assumptions and requirements that have to be fulfilled for the latter to be correct: There must be perfect competition in the market, and the total number of factors may never surpass the total number of assets (in order to avoid the problem of matrix singularity).

General Model 
For a set of assets with returns , factor loadings , and factors , a general factor model that is used in APT is:where  follows a multivariate normal distribution. Assuming that the noise terms for the returns and factors are uncorrelated, the mean and covariance for the returns are respectively:It is generally assumed that we know the factors in a model, which allows least squares to be utilized. However, an alternative to this is to assume that the factors are latent variables and employ factor analysis - akin to the form used in psychometrics - to extract them.

Assumptions of APT Model 
The APT model for asset valuation is founded on the following assumptions:

 Investors are risk-averse in nature and possess the same expectations
 Efficient markets with limited opportunity for arbitrage
 Perfect capital markets
 Infinite number of assets
 Risk factors are indicative of systematic risks that cannot be diversified away and thus impact all financial assets, to some degree. Thus, these factors must be:     
 Non-specific to any individual firm or industry
 Compensated by the market via a risk premium
 A random variable

Arbitrage
Arbitrage is the practice whereby investors take advantage of slight variations in asset valuation from its fair price, to generate a profit. It is the realisation of a positive expected return from overvalued or undervalued securities in the inefficient market without any incremental risk and zero additional investments.

Mechanics
In the APT context, arbitrage consists of trading in two assets – with at least one being mispriced. The arbitrageur sells the asset which is relatively too expensive and uses the proceeds to buy one which is relatively too cheap.

Under the APT, an asset is mispriced if its current price diverges from the price predicted by the model. The asset price today should equal the sum of all future cash flows discounted at the APT rate, where the expected return of the asset is a linear function of various factors, and sensitivity to changes in each factor is represented by a factor-specific beta coefficient.

A correctly priced asset here may be in fact a synthetic asset - a portfolio consisting of other correctly priced assets. This portfolio has the same exposure to each of the macroeconomic factors as the mispriced asset. The arbitrageur creates the portfolio by identifying n correctly priced assets (one per risk-factor, plus one) and then weighting the assets such that portfolio beta per factor is the same as for the mispriced asset.

When the investor is long the asset and short the portfolio (or vice versa) he has created a position which has a positive expected return (the difference between asset return and portfolio return) and which has a net zero exposure to any macroeconomic factor and is therefore risk free (other than for firm specific risk). The arbitrageur is thus in a position to make a risk-free profit:

Difference between the capital asset pricing model
The APT along with the capital asset pricing model (CAPM) is one of two influential theories on asset pricing. The APT differs from the CAPM in that it is less restrictive in its assumptions, making it more flexible for use in a wider range of application. Thus, it possesses greator explanatory power (as opposed to statistical) for expected asset returns. It assumes that each investor will hold a unique portfolio with its own particular array of betas, as opposed to the identical "market portfolio". In some ways, the CAPM can be considered a "special case" of the APT in that the securities market line represents a single-factor model of the asset price, where beta is exposed to changes in value of the market.

Fundamentally, the CAPM is derived on the premise that all factors in the economy can be reconciled into one factor represented by a market portfolio, thus implying they all have equivalent weight on the asset’s return. In contrast, the APT model suggests that each stock reacts uniquely to various macroeconomic factors and thus the impact of each must be accounted for separately. 

A disadvantage of APT is that the selection and the number of factors to use in the model is ambiguous. Most academics use three to five factors to model returns, but the factors selected have not been empirically robust. In many instances the CAPM, as a model to estimate expected returns, has empirically outperformed the more advanced APT.

Additionally, the APT can be seen as a "supply-side" model, since its beta coefficients reflect the sensitivity of the underlying asset to economic factors. Thus, factor shocks would cause structural changes in assets' expected returns, or in the case of stocks, in firms' profitabilities.

On the other side, the capital asset pricing model is considered a "demand side" model. Its results, although similar to those of the APT, arise from a maximization problem of each investor's utility function, and from the resulting market equilibrium (investors are considered to be the "consumers" of the assets).

Implementation

As with the CAPM, the factor-specific betas are found via a linear regression of historical security returns on the factor in question. Unlike the CAPM, the APT, however, does not itself reveal the identity of its priced factors - the number and nature of these factors is likely to change over time and between economies. As a result, this issue is essentially empirical in nature. Several a priori guidelines as to the characteristics required of potential factors are, however, suggested: 
 their impact on asset prices manifests in their unexpected movements and they are completely unpredictable to the market at the beginning of each period 
 they should represent undiversifiable influences (these are, clearly, more likely to be macroeconomic rather than firm-specific in nature) on expected returns and so must be quantifiable with non-zero prices 
 timely and accurate information on these variables is required
 the relationship should be theoretically justifiable on economic grounds

Chen, Roll and Ross identified the following macro-economic factors as significant in explaining security returns:

surprises in inflation;
surprises in GNP as indicated by an industrial production index;
surprises in investor confidence due to changes in default premium in corporate bonds;
surprise shifts in the yield curve.

As a practical matter, indices or spot or futures market prices may be used in place of macro-economic factors, which are reported at low frequency (e.g. monthly) and often with significant estimation errors. Market indices are sometimes derived by means of factor analysis. More direct "indices" that might be used are:
short-term interest rates;
the difference in long-term and short-term interest rates;
a diversified stock index such as the S&P 500 or NYSE Composite;
oil prices
gold or other precious metal prices
Currency exchange rates

See also
Beta coefficient
Capital asset pricing model
Carhart four-factor model
Cost of capital
Earnings response coefficient
Efficient-market hypothesis
Fama–French three-factor model
Fundamental theorem of arbitrage-free pricing
Investment theory
Modern portfolio theory
Post-modern portfolio theory
Rational pricing
Risk factor (finance)
Roll's critique
Value investing

References

Further reading

External links
The Arbitrage Pricing Theory Prof. William N. Goetzmann, Yale School of Management
The Arbitrage Pricing Theory Approach to Strategic Portfolio Planning (PDF), Richard Roll and Stephen A. Ross
The APT, Prof. Tyler Shumway, University of Michigan Business School
The arbitrage pricing theory Investment Analysts Society of South Africa
References on the Arbitrage Pricing Theory, Prof. Robert A. Korajczyk, Kellogg School of Management
Chapter 12: Arbitrage Pricing Theory (APT), Prof. Jiang Wang, Massachusetts Institute of Technology.

Arbitrage
Portfolio theories
Pricing
Financial models